The 55th Neste Rally Finland, the tenth round of the 2005 World Rally Championship season took place between August 4 and 7, 2005.

Entry List

Results

Event standings

Special Stages

Championship standings after the event

Drivers' championship

Manufacturers' championship

JWRC Drivers' championship

External links

 Overview at World Rally Archive
 Results at eWRC
 Results at RallyBase

Finland
Rally Finland
Rally